The following is a timeline of the history of the city of Beirut, Lebanon.

Prior to 20th century

 140 BC – City destroyed by Diodotus Tryphon.
 64 BC – Beirut conquered by Agrippa.
 14 BC – During the reign of Herod the Great, Berytus became a colonia.
 551 CE – Earthquake.
 635 – Beirut passes into Arab control.
 759 – Prince Arslan bin al-Mundhir founds the Principality of Sin-el-Fil in Beirut.
 1110 – Baldwin overtakes city, is absorbed into the Kingdom of Jerusalem.
 1187 – Saladin re-takes city.
 early 17th.C. - Fakhr al-Din II fortifies the town.
 1763 – Ottomans reclaim the city.
 1832 – Ibrahim Pasha of Egypt in power.
 1840 
 October: Battle of Beirut.
 Settlement of the hills surrounding the walled city begins, notably Moussaitbeh and Achrafieh 
 1853 – Grand Serail built.
 1858 – Hadiqat Al Akhbar newspaper begins publication.
 1860
 Druze–Maronite conflict.
 Sursock House built.
 1866 – Syrian Protestant College established.
 1868 – Archaeological Museum of the American University of Beirut established.
 1875
 Saint Joseph University founded.
 Thamarāt al Funūn newspaper begins publication.
 1877 – Lisan al-Hal newspaper begins publication.
 1883 – Hôtel-Dieu de France founded.
 1888 – Beirut was made capital of a vilayet (governorate) in Syria,[37] including the sanjaks (prefectures) Latakia, Tripoli, Beirut, Acre and Bekaa.
 1894 
 Saint George Maronite Cathedral constructed.
 Harbour, constructed by a French company.
 1895 – Railway completed "across the Lebanon to Damascus."
 1898 – Population: 120,000 (approximate).

20th century

1900s–1960s

 1999 al-Iqbāl newspaper begins publication.
 1907
 Railway to Aleppo completed.
 René Moawad Garden established.
 Baidaphon (record label) in business (approximate date).
 1916 –  Place des Canons renamed Martyrs' Square.
 1920 – Beirut Stock Exchange founded.
 1920 – 1 September: Lebanon Republic (Greater Lebanon) proclaimed a state.
 1921 – Beirut Traders Association founded.
 1924 – Al Joumhouria newspaper begins publication
 1925
 National Conservatory of Music established.
 Maghen Abraham Synagogue built.
 1927 – American Junior College for Women opens in Ras Beirut.
 1933
 Parliament of Lebanon building erected.
 An-Nahar newspaper begins publication.
 L'Orient newspaper begins publication.
 1934 – Population: 162,000 (approximate).
 1936 – Kamel Abbas Hamieh takes office as Governor of Beirut.
 1937
 Académie libanaise des beaux-arts founded.
 Ararad newspaper begins publication.
 Zartonk newspaper begins publication.
 1938 – Al Akhbar newspaper begins publication.
 1941 – Eastern Times newspaper begins publication.
 1942 – National Museum of Beirut opens.
 1943 – Beirut becomes capital city of independent Lebanon.
 1946
 Nicolas Rizk takes office as Governor of Beirut.
 Al-Hayat newspaper begins publication.
 1950 – Population: 181,271.
 1951 – Lebanese University and Lycée Franco-Libanais Verdun founded.
 1952
 George Assi takes office as Governor of Beirut.
 The Daily Star newspaper begins publication.
 1954 – Beirut Rafic Hariri International Airport opens.
 1956 – Bachour Haddad takes office as Governor of Beirut.
 1957 – Camille Chamoun Sports City Stadium opens.
 1958 – Population: 400,000 (estimate).
 1959
 Télé Liban (television) begins broadcasting.
 Philip Boulos takes office as Governor of Beirut.
 Al Anwar newspaper begins publication.
 1960
 Beirut Arab University established.
 Emile Yanni takes office as Governor of Beirut.
 1961
 Orient-Institut Beirut established.
 Sursock Museum and Phoenicia Beirut Hotel open.
 1963 – Gallery One (cultural space) opens.
 1964 – Saint Nicolas Garden opens.
 1966 – Al Ahed football team established, headquartered in Beirut.
 1967 – Chafik Abou Haydar takes office as Governor of Beirut.
 1968 – "Israel raids Beirut airport."

1970s–1990s

 1970
 L'Orient Le Jour newspaper begins publication.
 Population: 474,870 city; 938,940 urban agglomeration.
 Sassine Square construction ends 
 1972 – Manoukian Center established.
 1973 – Holiday Inn in business.
 1974 – As-Safir newspaper begins publication.
 1975
 April: Lebanese Civil War begins.
 Green Line established between mainly Muslim factions in West Beirut and the Christian Lebanese Front in East Beirut.
 Centre for Arab Unity Studies founded.
 1976 – al-Murābiṭ newspaper begins publication.
 1977 – Mitri El Nammar takes office as Governor of Beirut.
 1978 – Syrian siege of Achrafiyeh, the main Christian district of Beirut.
 1982
 Israeli invasion.
 14 September: Bachir Gemayel assassinated.
 1983 – French and US barracks bombed.
 1986 – Centre de Documentation et de Recherches Arabes Chretiennes founded.
 1987 – George Smaha takes office as Governor of Beirut.
 1988 – Ad-Diyar newspaper begins publication.
 1989 – Lebanese Center for Policy Studies headquartered in city.
 1990 – Center for Strategic Studies Research and Documentation
 1991 – Al Manar TV begins broadcasting.
 1992 – Nayef Al Maaloof takes office as Governor of Beirut
 1993
 B 018 nightclub opens.
 Future Television begins broadcasting.
 1994 – Solidere (redevelopment company) founded.
 1995 – Nicolas Saba takes office as Governor of Beirut
 1997
 Arab Image Foundation established.
 Camille Chamoun Sports City Stadium rebuilt.
 1999
 Yaacoub Sarraf takes office as Governor of Beirut.
 Planet Discovery children's museum inaugurated.
 Lebanese National Symphony Orchestra and Al-Kafaàt University founded.
 2000 – Museum of Lebanese Prehistory established.

21st century

2000s
 2001 – Beirut International Exhibition & Leisure Center opens.
 2003
 Beirut Marathon begins.
 Music Hall opens.
 Al-Balad newspaper begins publication.
 2004
 Souk el Tayeb farmer's market opens.
 Helem (LGBT group) active.
 Al-Saha Village restaurant in business.
 2005
 Cedar Revolution
 Nassif Kaloosh takes office as Governor of Beirut
 Ya Libnan news website launched.
 2006
 Political protests
 Robert Mouawad Private Museum opens.
 Sister city relationship established with Los Angeles, USA.
 2007 – Mohammad Al-Amin Mosque built.
 2008 – Platinum Tower built.
 2009
 2009 Jeux de la Francophonie held in Beirut.
 Beirut Art Center opens.
 Beirut Souks and Le Gray hotel in business.
 City named World Book Capital by UNESCO.

2010s
 2010
 Bilal Hamad becomes mayor.
 Four Seasons Hotel Beirut opens.
 2011
 Political protests
 Zaitunay Bay pedestrian area opens.
 2012
 Violent unrest related to Syrian uprising.
 Al-Mayadeen television begins broadcasting.
 19 October: Bombing in Achrafieh.
 16 November: Überhaus nightclub opens.
 2013
 9 July: Bombing in Bir el-Abed.
 15 August: Bombing.
 19 November: Iranian embassy bombings.
 27 December: Bombing.
 2015
 21 July: Protests.
 12 November: Bombing.

2020s
 2020
 4 August: Explosion in port
 2021
 14 October: Clashes

See also
 Beirut history
 List of governors of Beirut
 Timeline of Lebanese history

References

This article incorporates information from the French Wikipedia.

Bibliography

Published in 19th century
 
 
 
 
 

Published in 20th century
 
 
 
  — literary criticism
 
 
 Projecting Beirut. 1998.

Published in 21st century

External links

 Fulltext articles related to Beirut (via HAL, Centre pour la communication scientifique directe, France)
 

 
 
Beirut
Beirut
Beirut